is a private junior college in Kawaguchi, Saitama, Japan. Founded in 1987 as a junior college with 144 female students, it became coeducational in 2000.

External links

 Official website 

Japanese junior colleges
Educational institutions established in 1987
Private universities and colleges in Japan
Universities and colleges in Saitama Prefecture
Buildings and structures in Kawaguchi, Saitama
1987 establishments in Japan